Tears of the Sun is a 2003 American action thriller film depicting a fictitious U.S. Navy SEAL team rescue mission amidst the 21st-century version of the civil war in Nigeria. Lieutenant A.K. Waters (Bruce Willis) commands the team sent to rescue U.S. citizen Dr. Lena Fiore Kendricks (Monica Bellucci)  before the approaching rebels reach her jungle hospital. The film was directed by Antoine Fuqua.

Willis produced Tears of the Sun through Cheyenne Enterprises, his production company. The cast of Tears of the Sun includes actual African refugees living in the United States, incl. Sudanese Lost Boys.

Plot
Turmoil erupts in Nigeria following a military coup d'etat led by exiled General Mustafa Yakubu in which President Samuel Azuka and his entire family are reportedly assassinated. The ethnic enmity is between the Fulani Moslems in the north and Christian Ibo in the south. Foreigners evacuate the country and Lieutenant A.K. Waters and his U.S. Navy SEAL team consisting of Zee, Slo, Red, Lake, Silk, Doc, and Flea, board the aircraft carrier , to be dispatched by Captain Bill Rhodes to extract Dr. Lena Fiore Kendricks, a U.S. citizen by marriage to the late Dr. John Kendricks who was killed by rebels in Sierra Leone. Their secondary mission is to extract the mission's priest and two nuns, should they choose to come.

Waters gets to Kendricks, telling her that rebels are closing in on her hospital and the mission, and that his orders are to extract U.S. citizens; however, Kendricks refuses to leave without her patients that she loves so much. Waters calls Rhodes for options; after a brief conversation, he concedes to Kendricks' wishes and agrees to take those refugees able to walk. Kendricks begins assembling the able-bodied for the  hike; the priest and the nuns stay behind to take care of the injured.

Irritated and behind schedule, the team and the refugees leave the hospital mission after daybreak. At nightfall they take a short break. The rebels rapidly approach their position, and Waters stealthily kills one. Kendricks warns Waters that the rebels are going to the mission, but he is determined to carry out his orders, and they continue to the extraction point.

Back at the mission, the staff and refugees are detained by the rebels. Despite the priest's pleas for mercy, the rebels murder him and the remaining occupants.

When the team arrives at the extraction point, Waters' initial plan becomes clear: the SEALs suddenly turn away the refugees from the waiting SH-60B Seahawk helicopter. Waters forces Kendricks into the helicopter against her will, leaving the refugees stranded in the jungle, defenseless against the rebels. En route back to Harry Truman, they fly over the original mission compound, seeing it destroyed and all its occupants murdered, as Kendricks had feared.

Remorseful, Waters orders the pilot to return to the refugees. He then loads as many refugees as he can into the helicopter and decides to escort the remaining refugees to the Cameroonian border on foot.

During the hike to Cameroon, the SEALs discover the rebels are somehow tracking them. As they escape and evade the rebels, the team enters a village whose inhabitants are being raped, tortured, and massacred by the rebels. Cognizant of his ability to stop it, Waters orders the team to kill the rebels. The team is visibly shaken by the atrocities they see the rebels have committed against the villagers.

Again en route, Slo determines that a refugee is transmitting a signal allowing the rebels to locate them. A newer refugee picked up during the trek attempts to run but is shot. A transmitter is discovered on his body. As he bleeds out, he confesses that he is coerced to be the rat because his family had been captured by the rebels. The following search for his co-conspirators reveals the presence of Arthur Azuka, the surviving son of late President Samuel Azuka, which they realize is the reason the rebels are hunting them: Samuel Azuka was not only the president of the country, but also the tribal king of the Ibo. As the only surviving member of this royal bloodline, Arthur is the only person left with a legitimate claim to the Ibo Nation. Waters is angered that Kendricks knew this but did not inform him.

The SEALs decide to continue escorting the refugees to Cameroon, regardless of the cost. A firefight ensues when the rebels finally catch up with them, and the SEALs decide to stay behind as rearguard to buy the refugees enough time to reach the border safely.

Zee radios the Navy for air support; two F/A-18s take off and head towards them. The rebels kill Slo, Lake, Flea, and Silk. Waters, Red, Doc, and Zee are wounded, but direct the jets on where to attack. Arthur and Kendricks rush towards the now-closed Cameroonian border crossing when they hear the jets approach and bomb the pursuing rebels.

Waters, Zee, Doc, and Red rise from the grass as Navy helicopters land in Cameroon, opposite the Nigerian border crossing. Rhodes arrives and orders the gate open, letting in the SEALs and the refugees. They are then escorted onto the helicopters.

Rhodes promises Waters that he will recover the bodies of Waters' men. Kendricks bids tearful farewells to her Nigerian friends and flies away in a helicopter while comforting Waters, watching as Arthur is surrounded by his people proclaiming their freedom.

The movie ends with, "The only thing necessary for the triumph of evil is for good men to do nothing" quote attributed to Edmund Burke.

Cast

 Bruce Willis as Lieutenant A.K. Waters, US Navy - Team Commander
 Monica Bellucci as Dre Lena Fiore Kendricks - Doctor at the International Humantarian Aid
 Tom Skerritt as Captain Bill Rhodes, US Navy - Commanding Officer
 Cole Hauser as James "Red" Atkins, US Navy - Heavy Gunner and Explosives Specialist
  Paul Francis as Danny "Doc" Kelley, US Navy - Corpsman
 Eamonn Walker as  Ellis "Zee" Pettigrew, US Navy - Radioman and Grenadier
 Johnny Messner as Johnny Kelly "JKL" Lake, US Navy - Recon and Pointman
 Nick Chinlund as Michael "Slo" Slowenski, US Navy - SAW Gunner and Reconnaissance GPS Enemy Tech
 Charles Ingram  as Demetrius "Silk" Owens, US Navy - Sniper
 Chad Smith as Jason "Flea" Mabry, US Navy - Marksman
 Cornelia Hayes O'Herlihy as Sister Siobhan O'Connor
 Fionnula Flanagan as Sister Grace McIntyre
 Pierrino Mascarino as Father Giovanni Gianni
 Peter Mensah as Commander Terwase
 Malick Bowens as Colonel Idris Sadick
 Akosua Busia as Patience
Sammi Rotibi as Arthur Azuka, son of Nigeria President Samuel Azuka
Benjamin Ochieng as Colonel Emanuel Okeze, bodyguard of Arthur Azuka

Production
Harry Humphries, a former U.S. Navy SEAL, was the technical adviser to the film, having advised the earlier Black Hawk Down. The Navy repeatedly turned the carrier so that director Fuqua would have beneficial lighting conditions.

Release
The movie was shown in U.S. theaters on March 13, 2003, having premiered earlier on March 3. The 20-minutes longer "Director's Extended Cut" was released on DVD in 2005 and begins with the killing of the Nigerian president, adding political context. The Blu-ray theatrical cut was released in September 2006, containing low-definition deleted scenes instead of that extended cut.

Reception

Critical response
On review aggregator website Rotten Tomatoes, the film holds an approval rating of 33% based on 155 reviews and an average rating of 4.93/10. The website's critical consensus states that the film "tries to be high-minded, but in the end, it's just a stylish action movie." On Metacritic, the film has a weighted average score of 48 out of 100, based on 36 critics, indicating "mixed or average reviews".

Audiences polled by CinemaScore gave the film an average grade of "A−" on an A+ to F scale.

Roger Ebert gave the film three stars out of four and said, "Tears of the Sun is a film constructed out of rain, cinematography and the face of Bruce Willis. These materials are sufficient to build a film almost as good as if there had been a better screenplay."

See also

 List of films featuring the United States Navy SEALs

References

External links
 
 
 
 
 
 
 
 
 

2003 films
American action war films
2000s action war films
2000s English-language films
Films about United States Navy SEALs
Guerrilla warfare in film
Films set in Nigeria
Films set in jungles
Films shot in Hawaii
Films directed by Antoine Fuqua
Films scored by Hans Zimmer
Columbia Pictures films
Revolution Studios films
Refugees and displaced people in fiction
Films produced by Ian Bryce
2000s American films